Vigna parkeri, the creeping vigna or vigna menjalar, is a climbing or prostrate perennial vine that grows in subtropical areas such as Kenya, Indonesia, and Madagascar.

Description
The main rootstock is slender but tough. The stems are thin and often root at the nodes, and are sparsely to densely covered with mostly spreading hairs. The leaflets are rounded to acuminate at their apex and rounded to acute at their base, as well as pubescent on both sides with densely ciliate margins.

It has two to five inflorescences that are sometimes 10-flowered. The standard is blue, purple-blue, yellow, or white, and is usually paler at the base. The wings are blue, purple, or yellow. The keel is greenish with a purple tip or yellowish, and the beak is not curved inwards. The pods are pubescent or glabrous as well, and have two to five seeds.

Habitat and ecology
Vigna parkeri occurs in subtropical areas such as the Democratic Republic of Congo, Ethiopia, Rwanda, Uganda, Mozambique, Madagascar, Tanzania, and Kenya and is extremely common in East Africa. It is found in grasslands, grasslands with scattered trees, thickets, forests, pathways, and sometimes as a weed in cultivation.

In native and naturalised situations, it occurs on soils with textures ranging from sands to medium clays with a pH from 4.5 to 6.0, though it has difficulty establishing if the pH is outside the range of 5.4 to 5.8. These soils often have at least moderate levels of soluble aluminium. Growth slows during the heat of summer in the subtropics, and the best growth is produced during moist periods in spring and autumn. The top growth is killed even by light frosts, but regenerates readily from surviving rootstocks and stolons with the onset of warm conditions. It is adapted to both heavy and lenient grazing by due to its stolons and twining laterals.

References

External links
 
 

parkeri
Plants described in 1882